NanoString Technologies, Inc. (NASDAQ: NSTG) is a publicly-held biotech company offering discovery and translational research solutions. 

NanoString's products include the nCounter® Gene Expression System, the GeoMx® Digital Spatial Profiler, the CosMx™ Spatial Molecular Imager, and the AtoMx™ Spatial Informatics Platform. These four systems enable scientists to envision molecular interactions in three dimensions and see the multiomic expression of genes and proteins in the context of tissue structure. NanoString products are based on a novel digital molecular barcoding technology invented at the Institute for Systems Biology under the direction of Dr. Leroy Hood.

History 
The original patent forming the basis for the nCounter Analysis System was invented and licensed by The Institute for Systems Biology. The business plan was written by Amber Ratcliffe and Aaron Coe and won seed funding in multiple business plan competitions. NanoString was spun out of The Institute for Systems Biology and founded as a separate company in 2003 by Krassen Dimitrov, Amber Ratcliffe, and Dwayne Dunaway.

In 2008, NanoString launched the nCounter® Analysis System and began international sales operations with its first multiplexed assays for gene expression analysis.

In 2009, Perry Fell, who had been CEO since 2004, left the company abruptly without official explanation. Between 2009 and 2010, the company operated with an acting CEO, Wayne Burns. Brad Gray, a former Genzyme executive, was hired as president and CEO in 2010.

As of June 2010, the company was not yet profitable. In an interview, Gray suggested that NanoString would begin to develop clinical diagnostics.  As of July 2012, NanoString began indicating a move towards becoming a public company by hiring several senior staff with public company experience.

In 2013, the company's IPO raised funding to expand NanoString sales and marketing.
NanoString’s first spatial platform, the GeoMx DSP, was launched in 2019, enabling highly multiplexed spatial profiling of RNA and protein targets in various sample types, including FFPE tissue sections. The unique combination of high-plex and high-throughput spatial profiling allows researchers to rapidly and quantitatively assess the biological implications of heterogeneity within tissues and has resulted in over 150 peer-reviewed publications as of September 2022.

Technology & Products
NanoString's research tools are based on the nCounter® Analysis System, which is a modification of the DNA microarray technology.  The nCounter system allows for the simultaneous profiling of hundreds of genes, proteins, miRNAs, or copy number variations with high sensitivity and precision, using molecular barcodes and microscopic imaging in a hybridization reaction. 

To enable spatial transcriptomics and proteomics from one FFPE slide, NanoString introduced the GeoMx® Digital Spatial Profiler in 2019. The GeoMx DSP combines whole tissue imaging with gene expression and protein data for single cell resolution in a spatial context.

NanoString's product pipeline includes the development of the CosMx™ Spatial Molecular Imager, a single-cell imaging platform that is FFPE-compatible and powered by spatial multiomics. It allows researchers to map single cells in their native environments to extract deep biological insights and novel discoveries from one experiment.

In addition, NanoString has developed the AtoMx™ Spatial Informatics Platform, a cloud-based informatics solution with advanced analytics and global collaboration capabilities, which is expected to launch in 2022. The AtoMx platform provides a comprehensive, integrated ecosystem for spatial biology insights, enabling global data sharing and collaboration.

Overall, NanoString's continued investment in innovation has led to the development of a range of advanced research tools that offer high sensitivity, precision, and spatial resolution, allowing researchers to gain deep insights into biological systems.

References

Biotechnology companies of the United States
Companies based in Seattle
Companies established in 2003
Cancer screening
2013 initial public offerings